The 2017–18 Texas A&M Aggies women's basketball team represents Texas A&M University in the 2017–18 NCAA Division I women's basketball season. The team's head coach is Gary Blair, who was in his fifteenth season at Texas A&M. The team plays their home games at the Reed Arena in College Station, Texas and plays in its sixth season as a member of the Southeastern Conference. They finished the season 26–10, 11–5 in SEC play to finish in a 4 way tie for fourth place. They advanced to the semifinals of the SEC women's tournament where they lost to Mississippi State. They received an at-large bid to the NCAA tournament where they defeated Drake and DePaul in the first and second rounds before losing to Notre Dame in the sweet sixteen.

Roster

Rankings

^Coaches' Poll did not release a second poll at the same time as the AP.

Schedule and Results

|-
!colspan=12 style="background:#500000; color:#FFFFFF;"| Exhibition

|-
!colspan=12 style="background:#500000; color:#FFFFFF;"| Non-conference regular season

|-
!colspan=12 style="background:#500000; color:#FFFFFF;"| Conference Games

|-
!colspan=12 style="background:#500000;"| SEC Women's Tournament

|-
!colspan=12 style="background:#500000;"| NCAA Women's Tournament

References

Texas A&M Aggies women's basketball seasons
Texas AandM
Texas AandM
Texas AandM Aggies women's basketball
Texas AandM Aggies women's basketball